The Great Natchez Tornado hit Natchez, Mississippi on Thursday, May 7, 1840. This tornado was the second deadliest tornado in United States history; at least 317 people were killed and at least 109 were injured.

Event description 
This massive tornado formed approximately twenty (20) miles southwest of Natchez, shortly before 1 p.m., and moved northeast along the Mississippi River. It followed the river directly, stripping forests from both shores. The vortex then struck the riverport of Natchez Landing, located below the bluff from Natchez. This windstorm tossed 116 flatboats (of the 120 docked at Natchez that day) into the river, drowning their crews and passengers. Other boats were picked up and thrown onto land. A piece of a steamboat window was reportedly found 30 miles (50 km) from the river. Many doing business on shore were also killed. At Natchez Landing, the destruction of dwellings, stores, steamboats and flatboats was almost complete. It then moved into the town of Natchez, though its full width of devastation also included the river and the Louisiana village of Vidalia. It was reported that "the air was black with whirling eddies of walls, roofs, chimneys and huge timbers from distant ruins...all shot through the air as if thrown from a mighty catapult." The central and northern portions of Natchez were slammed by the funnel and many buildings were completely destroyed. Forty-eight people were killed on land, and 269 others were killed on the river.

Numerous other deaths may have occurred further along the path as the tornado struck rural portions of Concordia Parish, Louisiana as well. The Free Trader stated that "Reports have come in from plantations 20 miles distant in Louisiana, and the rage of the tempest was terrible. Hundreds of (slaves) killed, dwellings swept like chaff from their foundations, the forest uprooted, and the crops beaten down and destroyed. Never, never, never, was there such desolation and ruin."

Aftermath 
The final death toll was 48 on land (with 47 deaths in Natchez and one in Vidalia) and 269 on the river, mostly from the sinking of flatboats. In addition to the 317 deaths, only 109 were injured, a testament to the tornado's intensity. The tornado is to this day ranked as the second deadliest in American history, and caused $1,260,000 in damage. The actual death toll may be higher than what is listed, as slave deaths were often not counted during this time period.

Senate Document No. 199 (27th Congress, 2nd Session) was the report of the Commission to fix the demarcation between the United States and the Republic of Texas. In the Journal of the Joint Commission under date of May 26, 1840 at page 62 of said document, is written the following:
"We crossed to-day the path of a recent tornado, which had prostrated trees and cane on the river banks. Its course was observed to be from south 72 degrees west to north 72 degrees east, and the track to be from 300–400 yards [274–366 meters] wide. This was supposed to be the same tornado which occasioned such dreadful destruction of human lives and houses in Natchez on the 7th of May."
These observations were made on the Sabine River which is the boundary between Louisiana and Texas.

Regarding a final death count, the CNN web article,"The 10 deadliest US tornadoes on record" reports that, "The official death toll may not have included slaves, according to the Federal Emergency Management Agency."

See also
List of North American tornadoes and tornado outbreaks
Tri-State Tornado (1925) – The deadliest tornado in U.S. history as well as the second deadliest worldwide
Tornado outbreak sequence of Early-December 1953
1953 Vicksburg, Mississippi tornado

References

External links 
 http://www.islandnet.com/~see/weather/almanac The Great 1840 Natchez Tornado
 http://www.natchezcitycemetery.com The Great Natchez Tornado of 1840''
 The 10 deadliest US tornadoes on record
 The Natchez, Mississippi tornado of 1840

Tornado outbreaks with no Fujita scale ratings given
Tornadoes of 1840
Tornadoes in Mississippi
1840 in the United States
Natchez, Mississippi
1840 in Mississippi
May 1840 events